Haunted Hotels (also called America's Haunted Hotels) is an American paranormal television series that premiered on October 24, 2001 on the Travel Channel. The series features haunted hotels in America and the ghost stories that are told from employees and guests alike who work and stay in them. They give their own personal accounts about encounters with the supernatural while working or visiting a particular hotel.

Show Summary
The series is about ghostly goings-on in hotels across America (and in some episodes hotels in the United Kingdom and another one in France). Each hotel has a haunted history to it that leads the people from its past to stay behind. From ghosts that cause chills, and spirits that linger to poltergeists that move things around.

Each episode features different haunted hotels, motels, castles, and any overnight establishments in the United States and United Kingdom that leave its dark pasts behind for the living to experience for themselves. Dramatizations and special effects re-create true-life ghost stories from each haunted hotel.

Series Overview

Episodes

See also
 Ghost hunting
 List of reportedly haunted locations
 Paranormal television

Similar TV Programs

Celebrity Ghost Stories
Ghost Adventures
Ghost Hunters
Ghost Hunters International
Ghost Lab
Ghost Stories (2009 TV series)
Haunted Homes
Haunted History
Most Haunted
Most Terrifying Places in America
Scariest Places on Earth

References

External links
Haunted Hotels at aoltv.com

Haunted Hotels at LocateTV.com

Haunted Hotels Directory at RoomsWithAGhost.com

Haunted hotels
Travel Channel original programming
Television series by Authentic Entertainment
Paranormal television